A by-election was held for the Australian House of Representatives seat of Calare on 5 November 1960. This was triggered by the resignation of Liberal MP John Howse.

The by-election was won by Country Party candidate John England.

Results

References

1960 elections in Australia
New South Wales federal by-elections
November 1960 events in Australia